S. Gandhirajan is a Member of the Legislative Assembly (MLA) of Vedansandur, Tamil Nadu during the 16th Tamil Nadu Assembly (2021-2026).  He was elected to represent the constituency Vedasandur, then a constituency of dindigul district (Earlier under the "Palani Lok Sabha constituency", Currently under the "Karur Lok Sabha constituency"), in the election of 1991 During his period as MLA, He also held the position as the chairman of the "Tamilnadu Water and drainage Board department" (1992–1993) and also as the deputy speaker of the legislative assembly from 1993 to 1996.

In 2006 Gandhirajan's "sidelining" by the All India Anna Dravida Munnetra Kazhagam was considered to have weakened their position in Vedasandur, as Gandhirajan loyalists were less willing to work for the candidate nominated in his place. This led to his decision to join the opposition party Dravida Munnetra Kazhagam led by Dr. M. Karunanidhi (also cited as Kalaingar).

Elections contested

References

Living people
People from Karur district
Year of birth missing (living people)
Tamil Nadu MLAs 1991–1996
Tamil Nadu MLAs 2021–2026
Deputy Speakers of the Tamil Nadu Legislative Assembly
Vokkaliga politicians
Dravida Munnetra Kazhagam politicians